
Speedster may refer to:

Aircraft
 Kadiak KC-2 Speedster, a 1930s American radial engined homebuilt biplane design
 Rearwin Speedster, a 1930s American airplane design
 Theiss Speedster, an American biplane design

Automotive
 Speedster (automobile), a type of car body closely related to the roadster, examples of which are :
 Auburn Speedster
 Little Detroit Speedster
 Opel Speedster
 Plymouth Prowler
 Porsche Speedster
 Studebaker Speedster
 Confederate Hellcat Speedster, designed by South African Pierre Terblanche

Other uses
 Speedster (album), a studio album by Japanese boy band Generations from Exile Tribe
 Speedster (fiction), a character whose powers primarily relate to superhuman speed
 Speedster, a 1997 PlayStation game by Psygnosis

See also
 Roadster (disambiguation)